Daggett Township is a civil township of Menominee County in the U.S. state of Michigan. The population was 740 at the 2000 census. The village of Daggett is located within the township.

Geography

Demographics
As of the census of 2000, there were 740 people, 284 households, and 209 families residing in the township.  The population density was 20.6 per square mile (8.0/km2).  There were 380 housing units at an average density of 10.6 per square mile (4.1/km2).  The racial makeup of the township was 98.11% White, 0.27% African American, 0.14% Native American, 0.14% Asian, and 1.35% from two or more races.

There were 284 households, out of which 36.3% had children under the age of 18 living with them, 60.2% were married couples living together, 10.9% had a female householder with no husband present, and 26.1% were non-families. 22.2% of all households were made up of individuals, and 9.2% had someone living alone who was 65 years of age or older.  The average household size was 2.61 and the average family size was 3.06.

In the township the population was spread out, with 28.8% under the age of 18, 5.5% from 18 to 24, 28.1% from 25 to 44, 24.3% from 45 to 64, and 13.2% who were 65 years of age or older.  The median age was 38 years. For every 100 females, there were 100.5 males.  For every 100 females age 18 and over, there were 101.9 males.

The median income for a household in the township was $32,727, and the median income for a family was $35,729. Males had a median income of $27,232 versus $20,417 for females. The per capita income for the township was $13,767.  About 8.9% of families and 13.0% of the population were below the poverty line, including 21.3% of those under age 18 and 11.5% of those age 65 or over.

References

Townships in Menominee County, Michigan
Marinette micropolitan area
Townships in Michigan